Frank Hemingway was a professional rugby league footballer who played in the 1930s, 1940s and 1950s.

Playing career
Hemingway made his début for Featherstone Rovers on Saturday 10 November 1934, and made his début for Wakefield Trinity during January 1942, he appears to have scored no drop-goals (or field-goals as they are currently known in Australasia), but prior to the 1974–75 season all goals, whether; conversions, penalties, or drop-goals, scored 2-points, consequently prior to this date drop-goals were often not explicitly documented, therefore '0' drop-goals may indicate drop-goals not recorded, rather than no drop-goals scored. In addition, prior to the 1949–50 season, the archaic field-goal was also still a valid means of scoring points.

County Cup Final appearances
Hemingway played  left-, i.e. number 8, in Featherstone Rovers' 12-9 victory over Wakefield Trinity in the 1939–40 Yorkshire County Cup Final during the 1939–40 season at Odsal Stadium, Bradford on Saturday 22 June 1940.

Testimonial match
Hemingway's benefit season at Featherstone Rovers took place during the 1949–50 season.

Genealogical information
Frank Hemingway was the Grandfather of the rugby league footballer who played in the 1980s; Ian Slater.

References

External links

Search for "Hemingway" at rugbyleagueproject.org
Frank Hemingway
Featherstone Rovers Families: Hidden connections

English rugby league players
Featherstone Rovers players
Place of birth missing
Place of death missing
Rugby league props
Wakefield Trinity players
Year of birth missing
Year of death missing